Pedro de Mendoza (c. 1499 – June 23, 1537) was a Spanish conquistador, soldier and explorer, and the first adelantado of New Andalusia.

Setting sail 
Pedro de Mendoza was born in Guadix, Grenada, part of a large noble family that was preeminent in Spain. His family settled in Guadix after its reconquest by the Christians in 1489. He was a page at the Spanish court of Emperor Charles V and accompanied the sovereign on his trip to England. In 1524 he received the title of knight of the Order of Alcántara and later, through the influence of his father — the knight Fernando de Mendoza Guadix —  entered the Order of Santiago. He later fought in the Italian Wars against the French, in which he participated in the Sack of Rome in 1527.

In 1529, he offered to explore South America at his own expense and establish colonies. Thanks to the efforts of his mother, María de Mendoza, in 1534 his offer was accepted: he was made adelantado governor, captain general, and chief justice over New Andalusia. This grant allowed him authority over as much land as he could conquer, within 200 leagues of the southern limit of New Toledo. Although this was measured along the Pacific coast, it was understood that his efforts would be directed towards the Río de la Plata on the Atlantic. The Emperor gave Mendoza 2000 men and 13 ships on the condition that within two years Mendoza should transport 1000 colonists, build roads into the interior, and construct three forts.  He was to have half the treasure of the chiefs killed and nine-tenths of the ransom.  The office of Governor was also, in theory, made hereditary.

That year, he set sail with a considerable fleet, but a terrible storm scattered it off the coast of Brazil. Here his lieutenant, Juan de Osorio, was assassinated, according to some authorities by the orders of Mendoza himself because of suspected disloyalty. Mendoza sailed up the Río de la Plata in 1535 and founded Buenos Aires on February 2, 1536.

Although Mendoza is said to be the founder of Rio de la Plata (and Buenos Aires), he was not a very effective leader because he was debilitated by a severe case of syphilis. He spent half of his time ill in bed, but he put as much effort as he could into the expedition. No notable campaigns occurred in the River Plate during this time, and the only chronicler was a German soldier named Ulderico Schmidt (or Ulrico Schmidl). Schmidt came over to the River Plate with Don Pedro and stayed there for eighteen years, fighting in almost every battle. His account of this early history of the River Plate region is the most important document from that time period.

Battling the natives along the Rio de la Plata 

At the River Plata, the Spaniards encountered a group of roughly three thousand natives dispersed throughout the surrounding area known as the Querandíes, who shared with them their food, however scarce. In spite of this, the Spaniards soon took the natives and their generosity for granted and as a result, the Querandíes ended relations with the white men and relocated further away from the Spanish settlement. Angered by the sudden hostility, Mendoza sent his brother to lead a force against the natives.

Even though hundreds of natives were killed, Mendoza's brother was slain as well, along with thirty of his men and several horses at the Battle of the Luján River. The natives were driven off after that bloody battle and their provisions were taken, but the fight was very costly to the Spaniards.

Difficulties 

Every time it rained the wall partially dissolved. Along with this occasionally deteriorating wall, the colonists had to deal with another problem: famine. Food eventually became scarce, and the residents had to resort to eating rats, mice, snakes, lizards, rawhide boots, and even the bodies of those who died.

In addition to these difficulties, a coalition of the natives formed. They attacked the city again and again, many times leaving the city almost completely burned to the ground. Still suffering from syphilis, Mendoza appointed Juan de Ayolas to succeed him as captain-general.

Ayolas dealt with the problem by sailing up the Parana River with a large part of the remaining force. They defeated the Guaraní, made a treaty of friendship with them, and then Ayolas found the city of Asunción (in current-day Paraguay) in 1537.

Mendoza heads home 
While all of this was going on, Mendoza, disappointed and broken in health, embarked for Spain in 1537. He died during the voyage. He promised to send aid to his forces that he left behind in Buenos Aires. Although he begged Spain to send more men and provisions to save his city in his will, the help that was sent was not sufficient.

In 1541, the settlers abandoned Buenos Aires and moved to Asunción. Domingo Martínez de Irala was elected as the third (though temporary) governor by these men. With Buenos Aires in ruins, Asunción became the base for the reconquest of the Rio de la Plata region.

References

Further reading

Spanish conquistadors
Explorers of Argentina
1487 births
1537 deaths
History of Buenos Aires
History of Uruguay
People from Guadix
16th century in the Viceroyalty of Peru
16th-century explorers
16th-century Spanish people